The Reaves Arena is an 8,250-seat multi-purpose arena in Perry, Georgia, United States.  It was opened in 1990, hosting local sporting events and concerts. The arena is named in honor of Representative Henry L. Reaves (D-Quitman) who, along with Representative Larry Walker, was instrumental in the creation of the Georgia National Fairgrounds and Agricenter, where the arena is located.

References

External links
 zevents.com retrieved 11-22-11
 Reaves Arena - Georgia National Fairgrounds & Agricenter

Sports venues in Georgia (U.S. state)
Indoor arenas in Georgia (U.S. state)
Buildings and structures in Houston County, Georgia
1990 establishments in Georgia (U.S. state)
Sports venues completed in 1990
Tourist attractions in Houston County, Georgia